Avash (English: Hint) is a Dhaka-based Bangla rock band formed in 2017. The band were founded by Tanzir Tuhin (vocals), Raajue Sheikh (bass), Sumon Monjurul (lead), Rinku Imam (drums), Shawon Kaium (keyboards). As of 2020, the band has released four singles.

History

Formation
In 2017, Tanzir Tuhin, former lead vocalist of the band Shironamhin, became embroiled in controversy, and left the band on 7 October. On 16 December of the same year, Tuhin (vocals),former bassist of Obscure Raajue Sheikh (bass), Sumon Monjurul (lead), Rinku Imam (drums), Shawon Kaium (keyboards)- formed the band Avash. On 1 February 2018, the band performed their first live performance on the open stage at Jahangirnagar University.

The band released their debut single "Manush-1" on 15 May 2018. Later, on 27 January 2019, they released self-titled track "Avash". The group's third single, "Bastob", was released on 23 February in 2020. The music video for the song was directed by Arifur Rahman. And in January 2021 they released their latest single "Anath", which has an animated video.

Discography

Singles

Members

 Tanzir Tuhin (2017–present) – Vocals
 Raajue Sheikh (2017–present) –  Bass
 Sumon Monjurul (2017–2022) – Lead Guitar
 Rinku Imam (2017–present) – Drums
 Shawon Kaium (2017–2022) – Keyboards

Notes

References

Sources

External links

Musical groups established in 2017
2017 establishments in Bangladesh